Melanella adamantina is a species of sea snail, a marine gastropod mollusk in the family Eulimidae. The species is one of a number within the genus Melanella.

First described by Léopold de Folin in 1867 and named by him as Eulima adamantina. Type specimen collected in Panama.

References

External links
 To World Register of Marine Species

adamantina
Gastropods described in 1867